Rafael Moreno López (born 25 August 1966) is a Spanish retired Paralympic judoka who competed in international judo competitions. He won a silver medal at the 2000 Summer Paralympics, he is also a World bronze medalist and is a four-time European medalist.

References

1966 births
Living people
Sportspeople from Málaga
Paralympic judoka of Spain
Spanish male judoka
Judoka at the 1996 Summer Paralympics
Judoka at the 2000 Summer Paralympics
Judoka at the 2004 Summer Paralympics
Judoka at the 2008 Summer Paralympics
Medalists at the 2000 Summer Paralympics
Paralympic silver medalists for Spain
Paralympic medalists in judo
20th-century Spanish people
21st-century Spanish people